In journalism and mass media, sensationalism is a type of editorial tactic. Events and topics in news stories are selected and worded to excite the greatest number of readers and viewers. This style of news reporting encourages biased or emotionally loaded impressions of events rather than neutrality, and may cause a manipulation to the truth of a story. Sensationalism may rely on reports about generally insignificant matters and portray them as a major influence on society, or biased presentations of newsworthy topics, in a trivial, or tabloid manner, contrary to general assumptions of professional journalistic standards.

Some tactics include being deliberately obtuse, appealing to emotions, being controversial, intentionally omitting facts and information, being loud and self-centered, and acting to obtain attention. Trivial information and events are sometimes misrepresented and exaggerated as important or significant, and often include stories about the actions of individuals and small groups of people, the content of which is often insignificant and irrelevant to the macro-level day-to-day events occurring globally.

History 
In A History of News, author Mitchell Stephens (professor of journalism and mass communication at New York University) notes sensationalism can be found in the Ancient Roman Acta Diurna (official notices and announcements which were presented daily on public message boards, the perceived content of which spread with enthusiasm in illiterate societies). Sensationalism was used in books of the 16th and 17th century, to teach moral lessons. According to Stevens, sensationalism brought the news to a new audience when it became aimed at the lower class, who had less of a need to accurately understand politics and the economy, to occupy them in other matters. Through sensationalism, he claims, the audience was further educated and encouraged to take more interest in the news.
The more modern forms of sensationalism developed in the course of the nineteenth century in parallel with the expansion of print culture in industrialized nations. A genre of British literature, "sensation novels," became in the 1860s the best example of how the publishing industry could capitalize on a rhetoric made of surprising turns in the narrative to market serialized fiction in the expanded market of the periodical press. The London magazine "Belgravia", which was edited by the popular author of sensation novels Mary Elizabeth Braddon between 1867 and 1876, offered one of the earliest theories of modernity and its “shock value” mediated by sensationalism. The attention-grasping rhetorical techniques found in sensation fiction were also employed in articles on science, modern technology, finance, and in historical accounts of contemporary events, as discussed by Alberto Gabriele in Reading Popular Culture in Victorian Print. The collection of essays Sensationalism and the Genealogy of Modernity: a Global Nineteenth Century Perspective edited by Alberto Gabriele is also helpful to track the transhistorical presence of sensationalism in several national contexts in the course of the long nineteenth century. Scholars in the collection engage in an interdisciplinary discussion on popular culture, literature, performance, art history, theory, pre-cinema, and early cinema.

In mass media 

In the late 1800s, falling costs in paper production and rising revenues in advertising in the U.S. led to a drastic rise in newspaper's circulation, which attracted the growing audiences that advertisers desired. One presumed goal of sensational reporting is to increase or sustain viewership or readership, from which media outlets can price their advertising higher to increase their profits based on higher numbers of viewers and/or readers. Sometimes this can lead to a lesser focus on objective journalism in favor of a profit motive, in which editorial choices are based upon sensational stories and presentations to increase advertising revenue. Additionally, advertisers tend to have a preference for their products or services to be reported positively in mass media, which can contribute to bias in news reporting in favor of media outlets protecting their profits and revenues, rather than reporting objectively about stated products and services.

However, newspapers have a duty to report and investigate stories related to political corruption. Such investigative journalism is right and proper when it is backed up with documents, interviews with responsible witnesses, and other primary sources. Journalists and editors are often accused of sensationalizing scandals by those whose public image is harmed by the legitimate reporting of the scandal. News organizations are not obliged to (and are often ethically obliged not to) avoid stories that might make local, state and national public figures uncomfortable. Occasionally, news organizations mistakenly relay false information from unreliable anonymous sources, who use mass media as a tool for retaliation, defamation, victim and witness tampering, and monetary or personal gain. Therefore, any story based on sources who may be reasonably assumed to be motivated to act in this way is best interpreted with critical thinking.

In extreme cases, mass media may report only information that makes a "good story" without regard for factual accuracy or social relevance.  It has been argued that the distrust in government that arose in the aftermath of the Watergate scandal created a new business tactic for the media and resulted in the spread of negative, dishonest and misleading news coverage of American politics; such examples include the labeling of a large number of political scandals, regardless of their importance, with the suffix "-gate". Such stories are often perceived (rightly or wrongly) as politically partisan or biased towards or against a group or individual because of the sensational nature in which they are reported. A media piece may report on a political figure in a biased way or present one side of an issue while deriding another. It may include sensational aspects such as zealots, doomsayers and/or junk science. Complex subjects and affairs are often subject to sensationalism. Exciting and emotionally charged aspects can be drawn out without providing the elements needed (such as pertinent background, investigative, or contextual information) for the audience to form its own opinions on the subject.

In broadcasting 
Sensationalism is often blamed for the infotainment style of many news programs on radio and television. According to sociologist John Thompson, the debate of sensationalism used in the mass medium of broadcasting is based on a misunderstanding of its audience, especially the television audience. Thompson explains that the term 'mass' (which is connected to broadcasting) suggests a 'vast audience of many thousands, even millions of passive individuals'. Television news is restricted to showing the scenes of crimes rather than the crime itself because of the unpredictability of events, whereas newspaper writers can always recall what they did not witness. Television news writers have room for fewer words than their newspaper counterparts. Their stories are measured in seconds, not column inches, and thus (even with footage) television stories are inherently shallower than most newspaper stories, using shorter words and familiar idioms to express ideas which a newspaper writer is more free to expand upon and define with precision.

Online 
The digital revolution has completely changed the way people both create and react to news content. From a production standpoint, news outlets are now at a much higher risk of releasing content that is false because of how quickly news is circulated through the internet in order to capitalize on those views and clicks for profit. From a consumption standpoint, this means fewer people reading physical copies of newspapers and this is reflective in the way headlines are created for print media. The introduction of the term "clickbait" into the forefront of the global lexicon has had implications in many major world events, specifically the election of Donald J. Trump to the presidency of the United States, which reflects the growing weakness in "controlling the limits of what it is acceptable to say". Another reason for the concern over internet sensationalism is the way certain algorithms can create "news loops" that show people the exact same thing over and over again, known as "Echo chamber". Many characters on the internet have been able to profit off of these tactics by instilling fear through completely ridiculous and unverified sources which are able to self permeate online through these algorithms. While these algorithms are meant to prioritize more trustworthy sources, this doesn't always happen since they rely on keywords and phrases. As politics have become more polarized, these tactics have become increasingly prominent as news outlets realize how easy it is to push their own agendas on the internet in this fashion. It becomes easier to break the "Overton window", and the gatekeepers, journalists at major media organizations, are losing power. Many countries have implemented response efforts to this issue, as distrust in the media has become a global concern alongside the rapidly changing format of news media.

See also 

Agnotology, the study of culturally-induced ignorance or doubt
Betteridge's Law of Headlines
CNN effect
Censorship
Clickbait
Culture of fear
Disinformation
Dumbing down
Echo chamber (media)
Exploitation film
Fake News
Infotainment
Jazz journalism
Junk food news
Loaded words
Man bites dog
Mean world syndrome
Media bias in the United States
Media circus
Media manipulation
Misinformation
Missing white woman syndrome
Moral panic
Outrage porn
Profit motive
Propaganda model, in mass media
Pulp magazine
Sound bite
Spin, an interpretation of an event designed to sway public opinion
Succès de scandale
Tabloid journalism
Tabloid
Trial by media
Viral phenomenon
Yellow journalism

References

External links 

 "What's Wrong With the News?" from Fairness & Accuracy In reporting

Criticism of journalism
Influence of mass media
Mass media issues
News media manipulation
Public opinion
Popularity
Social influence